Rafael González (born 2 August 1956) is a Puerto Rican wrestler. He competed in the men's freestyle 68 kg at the 1976 Summer Olympics.

References

External links
 

1956 births
Living people
Puerto Rican male sport wrestlers
Olympic wrestlers of Puerto Rico
Wrestlers at the 1976 Summer Olympics
Place of birth missing (living people)